Oun or OUN may refer to

People
Ahmed Oun (born 1946), Libyan major general
Ek Yi Oun (1910–2013), Cambodian politician
Kham-Oun I (1885–1915), Lao queen consort
Õun, an Estonian surname; notable people with this surname
Oun Kham (1811–1895), Lao king
Oun Yao-ling (born 1940), Taiwanese weightlifter and Olympics competitor
Samsenethai ( Oun Huan; 1357–1416), Lao king

Acronyms
OUN, Organization of Ukrainian Nationalists
OUNS, Oxford University's The Newman Society
OUN-UPA (Ukrayins'ka Povstans'ka Armiya), Ukrainian Insurgent Army

Other
Chnam Oun 16 (disambiguation), Khmer-language films
Ounhmangu (or Oun hman gu), a Burmese coconut candy